Theron O. Kuntz (born December 25, 1953, Fort Atkinson, Wisconsin) is a game designer who was an early associate of Gary Gygax and employee of TSR.

Biography
Kuntz was born in Fort Atkinson, Wisconsin on December 25, 1953. His family moved to Lake Geneva, Wisconsin in 1955. Kuntz became involved in miniatures wargaming when he was 15 years old, learning about them from his brother Rob, who played miniatures and board games with his new friend Gary Gygax. The three of them would play miniatures battles at Gygax's house on his sand table. Kuntz was also a member of the Lake Geneva Tactical Studies Association with Gygax and his brother.

In the early 1970s, Terry, Rob, and Gygax's friend Don Kaye joined Gygax's children Ernie and Elise for the second session of Gygax's new game, the Dungeons & Dragons fantasy role-playing game. Don Kaye played Murlynd, Rob Kuntz played Robilar, and Terry Kuntz played Terik. Terry later conceived of the monster known as the beholder, and Gygax later detailed it for publication. Kuntz also created the magic weapon, the Energy-draining Sword.

Kuntz graduated from college in 1974, with a vocational diploma in mechanical drafting and design, but found it hard to find employment in that field. During 1974, TSR offered Kuntz employment with the company to help design rules, games, and to manage The Dungeon Hobby Shop. He joined TSR in 1975.

Early designs
 Castle Greyhawk Campaign proto-RPG development
 "Wargaming: A Moral Issue?" for Dragon magazine
 The Maze of Zayene D&D module
 The Empire of Zothar D&D-variant constructed nation
 Twilight of the Gods boardgame
 Treasure Search boardgame (lost)

References

1953 births
American game designers
Living people
People from Fort Atkinson, Wisconsin